Adam C. Bird is an American politician who is currently the Ohio state representative in Ohio's 63rd district. He won the seat after incumbent Doug Green became termlimited after his fourth term in office. He won virtually unopposed in 2020, winning 95.9% to 4.1% to writein candidates.

References

Living people
Republican Party members of the Ohio House of Representatives
21st-century American politicians
People from New Richmond, Ohio
1969 births